Janusz Turowski (born 7 February 1961 in Bydgoszcz) is a Polish football coach and former player. In the Polish League, he played a total of 128 matches and scored 28 goals.

Honours
Eintracht Frankfurt
DFB-Pokal: 1987–88

References 

1961 births
Living people
Polish footballers
Zawisza Bydgoszcz players
Pogoń Szczecin players
Legia Warsaw players
Eintracht Frankfurt players
1. FC Lokomotive Leipzig players
Bundesliga players
Polish football managers
Sportspeople from Bydgoszcz
Polish expatriate sportspeople in Germany
Polish expatriate footballers
Expatriate footballers in Germany
Expatriate footballers in West Germany
Association football forwards